Do Sher  is a 1974 Bollywood film starring Dharmendra.

Cast 
 Rajendra Kumar
 Dharmendra

Soundtrack

References

External links 
 

1974 films
1970s Hindi-language films